Opsilia is a genus of beetles in the family Cerambycidae. It is listed as a subgenus of Phytoecia by some sources.

Species
Opsilia aspericollis (Holzschuh, 1981)
Opsilia badenkoi (Danilevsky, 1988)
Opsilia bucharica (Breuning, 1943)
Opsilia chinensis (Breuning, 1943)
Opsilia coerulescens (Scopoli, 1763)
Opsilia irakensis Breuning, 1967
Opsilia longitarsis (Reitter, 1911)
Opsilia malachitica (Lucas, 1849)
Opsilia molybdaena (Dalman, 1817)
Opsilia prasina (Reitter, 1911)
Opsilia schurmanni (Fuchs, 1971)
Opsilia tenuilinea (Fairmaire, 1877)
Opsilia transcaspica (Fuchs, 1955)
Opsilia uncinata (W. Redtenbacher, 1842)
Opsilia varentzovi (Semenov, 1896)

References 

 
Lamiinae